Colm Byrne (born 1966) is an Irish playwright. He was born in Limerick and lives in Galway. His plays have been noted as political, lively
 and poetic. He is a recipient of a Bay Area Critics Circle award and is a writer in residence with the LA Writer's Center.

Works

Theatre
 Himself (2003) - Off-Broadway
 Bed Time for Bali (2005)
 Choke Point- The Downfall of Jayson Blair (2007) - Edinburgh Festival
 FreeFall:Heroes (2011)- Druid Theatre, Galway 
 State of Limn (2010) - Flatlake Festival 
 The Sum of All Things (2012) - Electric Picnic

Novels
 Jesus Wife (2014)

Film
Losing Ground

References

Sources

External links

General
 Choke Point, images
 

Irish dramatists and playwrights
Irish male dramatists and playwrights
1971 births
Living people